Limping for a Generation is the 1984 debut album by the British band The Blow Monkeys.

In the booklet to 1999 Atomic Lullabies – Very Best of the Blow Monkeys, lead singer Dr. Robert (born Robert Howard) categorized the record as jazz-punk, and defined The Blow Monkeys' early production by simply stating, in the same source: "Our early music was raw".

Formed in 1981, the group, after a one-off indie single, signed to RCA, and released Limping for a Generation.

The Blow Monkeys had only one external helper for this album: Pete Wilson, for production, string arrangements and additional keyboards).

Three of the four singles taken from their debut album, "Man from Russia", "Atomic Lullaby" and "Wildflower", can be found on their compilation album Choices - The Singles Collection, released in 1989. The later 1999 collection contains instead five B-sides from the 1984 album. As Dr. Robert writes, "[they] show us at our most relaxed and spontaneous ... and give a more rounded picture of what was really the most important thing to us... the music".

In the wake of The Blow Monkeys' later success, RCA reissued Limping for a Generation in 1986 with a new sleeve design. In 2012, Cherry Red announced the release of a 2-CD deluxe edition with a whole bonus disc of previously unissued demos and B-sides.

Track listing
All tracks composed by Dr. Robert (Robert Howard); except where noted
 "He's Shedding Skin" - 4:04
 "Wildflower" - 3:00
 "Atomic Lullaby" - 5:02
 "Fat Cat Belusha" (Howard, Mick Anker) - 4:15
 "Go Public" - 4:30
 "Professor Supercool" - 4:00
 "Man from Russia" (Howard, Mick Anker) - 3:15
 "Waiting for Mr. Moonlight" - 4:22
 "Limping for a Generation" - 3:32
 "Trashtown Incident" - 4:10

Singles from the album
 "Go Public" (1984)
 "Man from Russia" (1984)
 "Atomic Lullaby" (1984)
 "Wildflower" (1985)

B-Sides
 "Rub-a-dub Shanka" (1984; B-Side to "Go Public")
 "Resurrection Love" (1984; B-Side to "Man from Russia" single)
 "Slither" (1984; B-Side to "Man from Russia" maxi single)
 "My Twisty Jewel" (1984; B-Side to "Atomic Lullaby" single)
 "Kill the Pig" (1984; B-Side to "Atomic Lullaby" maxi single)

Personnel
The Blow Monkeys
Dr. Robert - vocals, guitars, piano
Tony Kiley - drums, percussion
Neville Henry - tenor saxophone, alto saxophone
Mick Anker - electric bass, acoustic bass
Technical
Peter Wilson - production, string arrangements, additional keyboards
Andrew Christian - art direction
Andrew Ekins - cover illustration 
Nick Knight - photography

Release details

References

External links
 MySpaceTV: The Blow Monkeys page – live video of The Blow Monkeys at the Camden Palace, London (1985), performing the song "Professor Supercool", which was released on Limping for a Generation', in 1984.
 MySpace: The Blow Monkeys page – audio clips to four songs from The Blow Monkeys, including previously unreleased track "Have No Roots".
 Fencat Online: Dr Robert's Official Website.

1984 debut albums
The Blow Monkeys albums
RCA Records albums